No. 1 Flight AAC was an independent flight within the British Army's Army Air Corps. It was formerly No. 1 Reconnaissance Flight AAC and before that No. 1901 Air Observation Post Flight RAF)

Aircraft operated:
 Saunders-Roe Skeeter AOP.12
 Sioux AH.1
 Westland Scout AH.1
 de Havilland Canada DHC-2 Beaver AL.1
 Britten-Norman BN-2 Islander AL.1

See also

 List of Army Air Corps aircraft units

References

Bibliography

Army Air Corps independent flights
Military units and formations established in 1957
Military units and formations disestablished in 2008